Mahmudabad (also Romanized as Maḩmūdābād) is a village in Chaleh Tarkhan Rural District, Qaleh Now District, Ray County, Tehran Province, Iran. At the 2006 census, its population was 3,322, in 764 families.

References 

Populated places in Ray County, Iran